Elaine Bloom (born September 16, 1937) is an American politician in the state of Florida. She is a member of the Democratic Party.

Bloom was born in New York City and graduated from Columbia University in 1957, where she majored in Government. Bloom is married with Judge Philip Bloom and have two children, Anne R. Bloom and David N. Bloom. The Bloom Family has lived in Miami-Dade County since 1962.

Bloom served in the Florida House of Representatives from 1974 to 1978 (for district 100), 1986 to 1992 (for district 104) and 1992 to 1995 (for district 106). She was speaker pro tempore of the House from 1992 to 1995.

In 2000, Bloom narrowly lost to E. Clay Shaw, Jr. the race for the Florida's 22nd congressional district by just over 500 votes.

In 2015, Bloom was named the president of Plaza Health Network.

References 

1937 births
Living people
People from Miami Beach, Florida
Politicians from New York City
Barnard College alumni
Businesspeople from Florida
Jewish American state legislators in Florida
Women state legislators in Florida
Democratic Party members of the Florida House of Representatives
21st-century American Jews
21st-century American women